This is a list of Japanese football transfers in the winter transfer window 2017–18 by club.

J1 League

J2 League

J3 League

References 

2017–18
Transfers
Japan